Cho Chan-ho (born 10 April 1986) is a South Korean football winger.

International career 
On 25 March 2011, Cho made his debut for national team in a friendly match against Honduras in which he came on as an 87th-minute substitute for Lee Yong-rae.

External links 
 Cho Chan-ho – National Team stats at KFA 
 

1986 births
Living people
Association football wingers
South Korean footballers
South Korea international footballers
Pohang Steelers players
Suwon Samsung Bluewings players
FC Seoul players
Seoul E-Land FC players
K League 1 players
K League 2 players